is a Japanese composer of video game music, singer, and video game voice actor. He has composed music for various games produced by Sega, including Virtua Fighter 2 and Shenmue. He first gained major recognition after the release of Daytona USA, for which he had written all music and personally sang all vocals.

With the arcade games, Derby Owners Club, World Club Champion Football and Star Horse, he also recorded live orchestras.

Aside from original compositions, he also arranges, provides vocals, and is a performer for a variety of projects, including S.S.T from 1988 to 1993, and [H.] from 2004 onwards.
He is well-known voicing the character Kage-Maru of Virtua Fighter franchise.

He has a younger brother named , who is a manga artist and member of the artist-writer duo Ark Performance along with Kōichi Ishikawa.

Works

Video games

Voice acting
{| class="wikitable"
!Year
!Title
!Role(s)
|-
|1993 || Burning Rival|| Bill
|-
|1993 || Virtua Fighter||Akira Yuki, Kage-Maru
|-
|1996 || Virtua Fighter 3|| Kage-Maru
|-
|2001 || Virtua Fighter 4 || Kage-Maru
|-
|2003 || Cyber Troopers Virtual-On Marz||Sgt. Hatter
|-
|2005 || 3rd Super Robot Wars Alpha: To the End of the Galaxy||Apharmd the Hatter
|-
|2006 || Virtua Fighter 5 || Kage-Maru
|-
|2012 || Phantasy Star Online 2||Himself (English and Japanese)
|-
|2012 || Sonic & All-Stars Racing Transformed||Announcer (Japanese)
|-
|2015 || Project X Zone 2||Kage-Maru
|-
|2017 || Sonic Mania||Competition Announcer
|-
|2022 || Party Quiz Sega Q||Himself
|}

 Concerts 
Mitsuyoshi's music from Shenmue was performed live at the first Symphonic Game Music Concert in Leipzig, Germany, in 2003. It was the first time that a concert featuring video game music was held outside Japan.

Mitsuyoshi attended the world-premiere of Play! A Video Game Symphony at the Rosemont Theater in Rosemont, Illinois, in May 2006. His music from the Shenmue series was performed by a full symphony orchestra. This event drew nearly 4000 attendees.

In 2007, his music from the World Club Champion Football series was presented at the fifth Symphonic Game Music Concert. Takenobu Mitsuyoshi joined the choir during the performance.

For Symphonic Shades – Hülsbeck in Concert in 2008, Takenobu Mitsuyoshi arranged music from Apidya'', by German composer Chris Hülsbeck. The event was performed by the WDR Radio Orchestra Cologne in Cologne, Germany, and marked the first live radio broadcast of a video game music concert.

His first dinner show was scheduled for March 22, 2020, but was postponed to August 23 of that year due to the COVID-19 pandemic, and then rescheduled again to January 24, 2021, due to the spread of the second wave of infection. He did an online dinner show livestream on August 23, 2020, to make room for the reschedule.

References

External links 

Composer profile at OverClocked ReMix

Japanese male composers
Japanese male musicians
Japanese male singer-songwriters
Japanese singer-songwriters
Japanese male video game actors
Japanese male voice actors
Living people
Sega people
Video game composers
20th-century Japanese composers
20th-century Japanese male actors
21st-century Japanese composers
21st-century Japanese male actors
1967 births
20th-century Japanese male singers
20th-century Japanese singers
21st-century Japanese male singers
21st-century Japanese singers